Beryllium telluride (BeTe) is a chemical compound of beryllium and tellurium. It is a crystalline solid with the lattice constant of 0.5615 nm. It is a semiconductor with a large energy gap of around 3 eV. 
Toxicity is unknown. Toxic hydrogen telluride gas is evolved on exposure to water.

References

External links

Beryllium compounds
Tellurides
II-VI semiconductors
Zincblende crystal structure